The TAG convoys were a series of Caribbean convoys which ran during the Battle of the Atlantic in the Second World War.

They take their name from the route: Trinidad to Aruba and Guantanamo, Cuba

Overview
The TAG series was the reverse of GAT series.

The series ran from August 1942 to May 1945.

There were 205 TAG convoys, comprising 3,843 individual ship listings.

Five convoys were successfully attacked by U-boats during 1942 and 1943, with 12 ships sunk and one damaged but then later declared a total loss.

Convoy list

Exceptions
There were two exceptions, namely special convoy TAG.SP, which ran in two sections from Trinidad to Kingston, Jamaica, and then on to Guantanamo in January 1943, without any losses, and Convoy TAG 205 which sailed from Curaçao to Guantanamo, and comprised only one ship.

Notes

External links 
 Full listing of ships sailing in TAG convoys

Bibliography
 
 
 

TAG 01
Battle of the Atlantic
Caribbean Sea operations of World War II